Dexter Westbrook (born 1943) is an American former professional basketball player. He played for the New Jersey Americans in seven games before being acquired by the Pittsburgh Pipers, for whom he played in five games, in the beginning of the 1967–68 ABA season. He had been drafted by the Baltimore Bullets in the 1967 NBA draft (44th overall) after a collegiate career at Providence College. He was only able to play his sophomore season for the Friars in 1964–65 before academic issues forced him off the team for the remainder of his collegiate career.

References

1943 births
Living people
American men's basketball players
Basketball players from New York (state)
Baltimore Bullets (1963–1973) draft picks
New Jersey Americans players
Sportspeople from Mount Vernon, New York
Pittsburgh Pipers players
Power forwards (basketball)
Providence Friars men's basketball players